Rustam Usmonov (born 30 January 1977) is a retired Tajikistan footballer who played as a forward.

Career statistics

International

Statistics accurate as of match played 11 September 2015

International goals

Honours
Vakhsh Qurghonteppa
Tajik League (2): 1997, 2009
Tajik Cup (1): 1997
Regar-TadAZ
Tajik League (1): 2001
Tajik Cup (1): 2001
Irtysh Pavlodar
Kazakhstan Premier League (2): 2002, 2003

References

External links

1977 births
Living people
Tajikistani footballers
Tajikistan international footballers
Vakhsh Qurghonteppa players
Tajikistani expatriate footballers
Expatriate footballers in Kazakhstan
FC Kairat players
FC Kyzylzhar players
FC Irtysh Pavlodar players
FC Zhetysu players
Association football forwards
Tajikistan Higher League players